Southern Bell Telephone and Telegraph Company was once the regional Bell Operating Company serving the states of Georgia, Florida, North Carolina, and South Carolina prior to the breakup of AT&T.  It also covered the states of Alabama, Kentucky, Louisiana, Mississippi, and Tennessee until 1968 when those were split off to form South Central Bell.

The company was originally known as the Atlanta Telephonic Exchange, having been created to service citizens of Atlanta in 1879, before it was renamed in 1882.

Southern Bell also operated in Charleston and other parts of West Virginia, from 1883 until 1917, when the Chesapeake and Potomac Telephone Company of West Virginia took over operations there.

Split into South Central Bell & Southern Bell
Southern Bell originally served nine Southern states. On December 20, 1967, the western portion of the Southern Bell territory (Alabama, Kentucky, Louisiana, Mississippi, and Tennessee) was split off as South Central Bell Telephone Company.

Landmark sex discrimination case

Weeks v. Southern Bell was an important sex discrimination case in which Lorena Weeks claimed that Southern Bell had violated her rights under the 1964 Civil Rights Act when they denied her application for promotion to a higher paying position because she was a woman. She was represented in the case by Sylvia Roberts, a National Organization for Women attorney. She lost the initial case but won in 1969 after several appeals. Weeks v. Southern Bell was an important case as it marked the first victory in which NOW used the Civil Rights Act to fight sex-based discrimination.

Reincorporation

Southern Bell, originally incorporated in New York, was reincorporated in Georgia in 1983 as SBT&T Co. The original Southern Bell was then merged into SBT&T Co., at which point that company was renamed Southern Bell. Since BellSouth, the new owner of Southern Bell and South Central Bell upon the divestiture of AT&T, was based in Georgia, it was more practical to have Southern Bell incorporated in the same state. Southern Bell was renamed BellSouth Telecommunications until it was merged into AT&T in 2006.

Southern Bell was headquartered in (what is now) the AT&T Midtown Center building in Atlanta, Georgia. Most Atlanta operations have now been relocated to AT&T Headquarters in Dallas, Texas. Downtown Atlanta's telephone exchange is located in the Art Deco AT&T Communications
Building.

See also
AT&T
AT&T Corporation, now a subsidiary
BellSouth Telecommunications

References

AT&T subsidiaries
Bell System
Economy of the Southeastern United States
American companies established in 1879
American companies disestablished in 1983
Defunct telecommunications companies of the United States
Telecommunications companies established in 1879
Communications in Georgia (U.S. state)
Communications in Florida
Communications in North Carolina
Communications in South Carolina
Communications in Alabama
Communications in Louisiana
Communications in Kentucky
Communications in Mississippi
Communications in Tennessee